The Call of the North is a 1929 German  adventure film directed by Nunzio Malasomma and Mario Bonnard and starring Luis Trenker, Max Holzboer, and Eva von Berne. Originally produced as a silent film, it was subsequently released with an added soundtrack.

The only survivor of a polar expedition returns to try to find out what happened to his colleagues. It is similar to the tradition of mountain films, with large amounts of location footage shot, but with the setting moved to the North Pole.

The film's sets were designed by Heinrich Richter.

Cast

References

Bibliography

External links 
 

1929 films
1929 adventure films
German adventure films
Films of the Weimar Republic
1920s German-language films
Films directed by Nunzio Malasomma
Films directed by Mario Bonnard
Films set in the Arctic
German black-and-white films
1920s German films